Obadiah was the name of a Khazar ruler of the late eighth or early ninth century. He is described as coming from among "the sons of the sons" of Bulan, but whether this should be taken literally to mean that he was Bulan's grandson, or figuratively to imply a more remote descent, is unclear. He was succeeded by his son Hezekiah.

Sources
Kevin Alan Brook. The Jews of Khazaria. 2nd ed. Rowman & Littlefield Publishers, Inc, 2006.
Douglas M. Dunlop, The History of the Jewish Khazars, Princeton, N.J.: Princeton University Press, 1954.
Norman Golb and Omeljan Pritsak, Khazarian Hebrew Documents of the Tenth Century. Ithaca: Cornell Univ. Press, 1982.

Turkic rulers
Khazar rulers
9th-century rulers in Europe
Jewish monarchs
9th-century Jews
Jewish royalty